Maescar is a community in the county of Powys, Wales, and is 35.4 miles (56.9 km) from Cardiff and 148.7 miles (239.3 km) from London. It is in the historic county of Brecknockshire.

Description

The villages of Defynnog and Sennybridge lie in the community of Maescar. There are around 10 round cairns and notable standing stones within the community, dating back to the Iron Age.

In 2011 the population of Maescar was 965 with 24.0% of inhabitants able to speak Welsh.

Governance
Maescar has a community council with eleven locally elected or co-opted community councillors. They consider planning applications and other matters of local interest.

Maescar fall within the electoral ward called Maescar/Llywel (which also includes the neighbouring communities of Llywel and Cray). The ward elects a county councillor to sit on Powys County Council. The population of this ward at the 2011 Census was 1,703.

See also
List of localities in Wales by population

References

External links
 Maescar Community Council website

Communities in Powys